Fantastic Voyage is an American animated science fiction TV series based on the famous 1966 film directed by Richard Fleischer. The series consists of 17 half-hour episodes, airing Saturday mornings on ABC-TV from September 14, 1968, through January 4, 1969, then rebroadcast the following fall season. The series was produced by Filmation Associates in association with 20th Century Fox. A Fantastic Voyage comic book, based on the series, was published by Gold Key and lasted two issues.

The show was later broadcast in reruns on the Sci Fi Channel's Cartoon Quest, from 1992 to 1996.

There are currently no plans to release the series on DVD and/or Blu-ray Disc in Region 1 from 20th Century Studios Home Entertainment, although most of the series is available for viewing on YouTube, and the show was released on DVD in the United Kingdom years previously.

Premise
Fantastic Voyage is the story of the C.M.D.F. (Combined Miniature Defense Force), a secret United States government organization that possessed the ability to reduce people to microscopic size.

The main characters were Commander Jonathan Kidd; biologist Erica Lane; scientist Busby Birdwell; and a "master of mysterious powers" known only as Guru. The team was reduced in size for its missions, each miniaturization period having a time limit of 12 hours, and it traveled around in a microscopic flying submarine, the Voyager, doing battle against the unseen, unsuspecting enemies of the free world, both criminal and germinal matter. The missions of the team were given out and supervised by Professor Carter, in charge of the miniaturization process, and a character usually referred to as "the Chief" (presumably the overall leader of the CMDF), who was always seen only in shadow.  Occasionally, the four were accompanied by people who did not work for CMDF, but who Professor Carter and The Chief felt would be helpful.  More often than not, these people were villains. The series featured character voices provided by Marvin Miller, Jane Webb, and Ted Knight. The producers were Lou Scheimer and Norm Prescott, the director was Hal Sutherland, and the music was provided by Gordon Zahler.

Changes from the film, aside from the ship's crew, included the duration of miniaturization (one hour in the film, 12 in the cartoon) and the meaning of the acronym CMDF from "Combined Miniaturized Deterrent Force" to "Combined Miniature Defense Force".

Opening narration
<blockquote>Headquarters: CMDF--Combined Miniature Defense Force. Project: Fantastic Voyage. Process: Miniaturization. Authority: Top Secret, highest clearance. Team: Jonathan Kidd, Commander. Guru, master of mysterious powers. Erica Lane, doctor, biologist. Busby Birdwell, scientist, inventor, builder of the Voyager. Mission: In their miniaturized form, to combat the unseen, unsuspected enemies of freedom. Time limit: Twelve hours.</blockquote>

Voyager model
While the series was in production, the Aurora Model Company developed a plastic model of the Voyager, releasing it only months before the series' cancellation was announced. Due to the short run of the show, this kit received only one press run, and as a result, it is one of the rarest kits to find in the Aurora line. A contributing factor to this scarcity is that most of the kits were bought for use as toys (by fans of the show) rather than as static display or collectors's items; thus they were lost, broken or disposed of long before they became "collectables."

Unbuilt, in-box kits have been sold on eBay for prices between US$300 and US$700.  Assembled and partially assembled models in varied conditions from "acceptable" to "well-worn" have been sold for over $100, depending on their condition.

Polar Lights, a company which owned the rights to re-produce the kit, passed on re-releasing the subject. Company director Dave Metzner stated that they had to produce much more in-demand subjects in order to be able to afford even considering the production of such niche products.

However, Moebius Models retooled from an original kit, and went into production on a reproduction Voyager'' kit, including the original distinctive delta-shaped stand used for Aurora aircraft models.

Episodes

Home media
The complete series was released, as a 3-disc DVD set, in the United Kingdom by Revelation Films on November 21, 2011.

References

External links
 
 

1960s American animated television series
1968 American television series debuts
1970 American television series endings
American children's animated science fiction television series
Television series about size change
Television series by Filmation
American Broadcasting Company original programming
Animated television shows based on films
Television series by 20th Century Fox Television
Television shows directed by Hal Sutherland